Croatian Democratic Alliance of Slavonia and Baranja ( or HDSSB) is a regionalist, National conservatism political party in the Eastern Croatian region of Slavonia. Until 2015, the HdSSB was considered right-wing populist.

It was formally founded on 6 May 2006, but had its origins one year earlier, when the group of local Croatian Democratic Union (HDZ) politicians, led by War of Independence veteran Branimir Glavaš, launched a political organisation with a very similar name, the Croatian Democratic Assembly of Slavonia and Baranja at the eve of May 2005 local elections. The stated aim of new group was the regional reorganisation of Croatia in order to improve conditions in Slavonia, which was - according to Glavaš and his supporters - neglected by central government in Zagreb.

The HDZ leadership under Ivo Sanader denounced that platform and ejected Glavaš out of the party. However, most of the local HDZ organisation followed Glavaš and his independent election ticket that won a relative majority in the Osijek-Baranja County and City of Osijek assemblies. That group of independents became the HDSSB on 6 May 2006. In the 2007 Croatian parliamentary election they received 44,552 votes or 1.8% of the electorate, and won 3 seats in the Croatian Parliament. They improved their position in Croatian Parliament in next election by winning 6 seats.

In 2014, HDSSB became part of the Alliance for Croatia coalition, which was dissolved in 2015.

Electoral history

Legislative

European Parliament

References

External links
 

Conservative parties in Croatia
Nationalist parties in Croatia
Political parties established in 2006
Regionalist parties in Croatia
Regionalist parties
2006 establishments in Croatia
National conservative parties
Green conservative parties
Croatian nationalist parties